Alma is a town in Victoria, Australia, along the Maryborough – St Arnaud Road, west of Maryborough.

Alma began as a gold-mining settlement and was named after the Battle of Alma in the Crimean War. It was surveyed in 1860, the Post Office opening on 1 July 1861. (closed 1969), and proclaimed in 1891. It had a peak population of 2,109.

References

Mining towns in Victoria (Australia)
Towns in Victoria (Australia)
1860 establishments in Australia